Mansur is a crater on Mercury.  Its name was adopted by the International Astronomical Union in 1979. Mansur is named for the Indian artist Ustad Mansur, who lived in the 17th century CE.

The Mansurian time period on Mercury is named after Mansur crater. The time of its impact does not denote the start of the period, but the crater is an excellent example of a Mansurian crater.

Views

References

Impact craters on Mercury